The 1921–22 FA Cup was the 47th season of the world's oldest football knockout competition; the Football Association Challenge Cup, or FA Cup for short. The large number of clubs entering the tournament from lower down the English football league system meant that the competition started with a number of preliminary and qualifying rounds. The 12 victorious teams from the Sixth Round Qualifying progressed to the First Round Proper.

Extra preliminary round

Ties

Replays

2nd replays

Preliminary round

Ties

Replays

2nd replays

1st qualifying round

Ties

2nd qualifying round

Ties

Replays

3rd qualifying round

Ties

1921–22 FA Cup
See 1921–22 FA Cup for details of the rounds from the First Round Proper onwards.

External links
 Football Club History Database: FA Cup 1921–22
 FA Cup Past Results

Qualifying
FA Cup qualifying rounds